Chapada is a municipality in the state of Rio Grande do Sul, Brazil.  As of 2020, the estimated population was 9,239.

Regional language
 Riograndenser Hunsrückisch (a local variety of the German language belonging to the West Central German dialect group)

See also
List of municipalities in Rio Grande do Sul

References

Municipalities in Rio Grande do Sul